German Bokun (27 August 1922 – 8 March 1978) was a Belarusian-Soviet fencer. He competed in the individual and team foil events at the 1952 Summer Olympics.

References

1922 births
1978 deaths
Belarusian male foil fencers
Soviet male foil fencers
Olympic fencers of the Soviet Union
Fencers at the 1952 Summer Olympics